Hamish Alexander Carter (born 24 November 1998) is a British artistic gymnast. He won gold in the team all-around and silver on the floor at the 2015 European Youth Summer Olympic Festival. He represented Scotland at the 2018 Commonwealth Games: he won a bronze medal in the team all around event alongside Frank Baines, Daniel Purvis, David Weir and Kelvin Cham, placed 6th in the individual all around event, and placed 4th in the individual floor event.

Carter was born on 24 November 1998 in Sutton Coldfield, Birmingham, England. He has Scottish heritage through his mother. He was educated at Bishop Vesey's Grammar School, a state grammar school in Sutton Coldfield.

References

External links
 

1998 births
Living people
British male artistic gymnasts
Scottish gymnasts
Commonwealth Games medallists in gymnastics
Commonwealth Games bronze medallists for Scotland
Gymnasts at the 2018 Commonwealth Games
Sportspeople from Sutton Coldfield
Sportspeople from Birmingham, West Midlands
People educated at Bishop Vesey's Grammar School
Gymnasts at the 2022 Commonwealth Games
Medallists at the 2018 Commonwealth Games